A Midsummer Night's Dream is a 1968 British film of William Shakespeare's play A Midsummer Night's Dream, directed by Peter Hall.

Production
It stars Derek Godfrey as Theseus, Barbara Jefford as Hippolyta, Diana Rigg as Helena, Helen Mirren as Hermia, David Warner as Lysander, Ian Holm as Puck, Ian Richardson as King Oberon, Judi Dench as Queen Titania, and Paul Rogers as Bottom, as well as other members of the Royal Shakespeare Company.

The film premiered in theatres in Europe in September 1968. In the U.S., it was sold directly to television rather than playing in theatres, and premiered as a Sunday evening special, on the night of 9 February 1969. It was shown on CBS (with commercials).

The film was only the second, after Max Reinhardt's 1935 film, sound film adaptation of the play. It portrayed the fairies as "wild, near-naked creatures in a primitive, sinister wood." and "the subsidiary fairies were bedraggled child actors; the artisans authentic, almost contemporary rustics." that "contrasted with the sedate courtly milieu of an actual Warwickshire country house." Sukanta Chaudhuri—editor of The Arden Shakespeare, third series edition of the play—describes it as "a notable blending of the traditional with the innovative." Peter Holland, editor of The Oxford Shakespeare edition described it as "[turning] the sentimentality into something rougher and muddier; his fairies, accompanying Titania (Judi Dench), naked with her modesty covered by a long wig, were dirty urchins covered in mud."

The "Athens" scenes were shot at Compton Verney House.

Cast

Reception
The film was generally poorly received by critics. Penelope Houston, reviewing the film for The Spectator, wrote:

References
Informational notes

Citations

Bibliography

Further reading

External links
 
 
 
 Screenonline - more information
 

1968 films
1960s fantasy drama films
British fantasy drama films
Films based on A Midsummer Night's Dream
Films set in country houses
Films directed by Peter Hall
Filmways films
1968 drama films
1960s English-language films
1960s British films